Peacock Productions was a long-form production unit of NBC News. The division, established on July 15, 2007, primarily produced one-off factual programs and specials, airing across both NBCUniversal and third-party networks. Peacock served as an incubator for new production technologies that have later been adopted by NBC News, such as tapeless recording.

The studio was shut down on March 2, 2020, with NBC News citing changes to its strategies on documentaries.

History
Peacock was established on July 15, 2007 by the merger of NBC News Productions, NBC Media Productions, & the digital unit NBC Next Media, along with the staff of NBC's newsmagazine Dateline.  The merger came in response to the growing popularity of non-fiction programming on television (with a particular emphasis on cable channels and digital outlets), and in the wake of a recent series of budget cuts at NBC Universal that affected NBC News's long-form production units

In May 2012, Today senior producer Marc Victor stepped down and joined Peacock to lead a new unit, Tomorrow Productions — which would leverage the resources and talent of Today. In 2013, Peacock produced Skywire Live for Discovery Channel, a live special that featured Nik Wallenda's crossing of the Little Colorado River gorge near Grand Canyon National Park.

The studio shut down on March 2, 2020, with NBC News stating that it was "shifting its documentary strategy to an entirely new model, consistent with industry trends". An employee reported that streaming video had reduced the demand for the type of low-cost documentaries traditionally made by Peacock.

Television

References

NBC News
Television production companies of the United States
2007 establishments in New York City
Mass media companies disestablished in 2020